is Berryz Kobo's 32nd single. which was released on June 19, 2013 in 5 versions: 1 regular version and 4 Limited Editions.

The album sold an estimated 36,000 copies, reaching 6th on the weekly Orion charts.

Track list
Golden Chinatown
Sayonara Usotsuki no Watashi
Golden Chinatown (instrumental)
Sayonara Usotsuki no Watashi (instrumental)
 Hacked by Code:51 NeoRaz3r

Limited edition A DVD
Golden Chinatown (music video)
Golden Chinatown (dance shot ver.)

Limited edition B DVD
Sayonara Usotsuki no Watashi (music video)
Sayonara Usotsuki no Watashi (dance shot ver.)

Limited edition C DVD
Golden Chinatown (close-up ver.)
Sayonara Usotsuki no Watashi (close-up ver.)
Making of

Event V "Golden Chinatown"
Golden Chinatown (Shimizu Saki solo ver.)
Golden Chinatown (Tsugunaga Momoko solo ver.)
Golden Chinatown (Tokunaga Chinami solo ver.)
Golden Chinatown (Sudo Maasa solo ver.)
Golden Chinatown (Natsuyaki Miyabi solo Ver.)
Golden Chinatown (Kumai Yurina solo ver.)
Golden Chinatown (Sugaya Risako solo ver.)

Event V "Sayonara Usotsuki no Watashi"
Sayonara Usotsuki no Watashi (Shimizu Saki solo ver.)
Sayonara Usotsuki no Watashi (Tsugunaga Momoko solo ver.)
Sayonara Usotsuki no Watashi (Tokunaga Chinami solo ver.)
Sayonara Usotsuki no Watashi (Sudo Maasa solo ver.)
Sayonara Usotsuki no Watashi (Natsuyaki Miyabi solo ver.)
Sayonara Usotsuki no Watashi (Kumai Yurina solo ver.)
Sayonara Usotsuki no Watashi (Sugaya Risako solo ver.)

Featured members
Shimizu Saki
Tsugunaga Momoko
Tokunaga Chinami
Sudo Maasa
Natsuyaki Miyabi
Kumai Yurina
Sugaya Risako

TV performances
[2013.06.05] IDOL REVUE MUSiC×iD

Concert performances
 Golden Chinatown—Berryz Koubou Concert Tour 2013 Haru ~Berryz Mansion Nyuukyosha Boshuuchuu!~
 Sayonara Usotsuki no Watashi—Hello! Project Yaon Premium Live ~Soto Fest~, Hello! Project 2013 SUMMER COOL HELLO! ~Mazekoze~

Song Information
Golden Chinatown
Lyrics & composition: Tsunku
Arrangement: Suzuki Shunsuke
Vocals:
Main vocals: Tsugunaga Momoko, Kumai Yurina
Minor vocals: Shimizu Saki
Center vocals: Natsuyaki Miyabi, Sugaya Risako
Sayonara Usotsuki no Watashi
Lyrics and composition: Tsunku
Arrangement: Hirata Shoichiro
Vocals:
Main vocals: Natsuyaki Miyabi, Sugaya Risako
Minor vocals: Tsugunaga Momoko

Chart positions

Total reported sales: 36,023

References

External links
Discography: Hello! Project, UP-FRONT WORKS, Tsunku.net
Tsunku's Official Comments
Wikipedia: Japanese
CDJapan Listings: Regular, Limited A, Limited B, Limited C, Limited D
Lyrics: Golden Chinatown, Sayonara Usotsuki no Watashi

2013 songs
Berryz Kobo songs
Songs written by Tsunku
Song recordings produced by Tsunku
2013 singles
Zetima Records singles